(William Robert) Stanley Prescott (25 April 1912 – 6 June 1962) was a Conservative Party politician in the United Kingdom.

He was educated at St John's College, Cambridge.

He was elected as Member of Parliament (MP) for the Darwen constituency at a by-election in December 1943 following the death of the Conservative MP Stuart Russell. He held the seat until he retired from the House of Commons at the 1951 general election.

He was the younger son of the Sir William Prescott, who was MP for Tottenham North from 1918 to 1922. His son, Mark Prescott, inherited the baronetcy in 1965.

Notes

References 

 

1912 births
1962 deaths
Alumni of St John's College, Cambridge
Conservative Party (UK) MPs for English constituencies
UK MPs 1935–1945
UK MPs 1945–1950
UK MPs 1950–1951
Younger sons of baronets